František Hanus (born 22 April 1982) is a Czech footballer who plays as a midfielder.
He is currently contracted to FK Fotbal Třinec.

External links
Club profile 

1982 births
Living people
People from Břeclav
Czech footballers
Bohemians 1905 players
FK Dukla Prague players
FK Fotbal Třinec players
Association football midfielders
Sportspeople from the South Moravian Region